Charles Hussman is a retired American football coach.  He was the head football coach at the Martin Luther College in New Ulm, Minnesota in 2004, a season in which he would be named Upper Midwest Athletic Conference Coach of the Year.

Head coaching record

College

References

Year of birth missing (living people)
Living people
Martin Luther Knights football coaches